Horismenus floridensis is a species of hymenopteran insect of the family Eulophidae. It is parasitic on the pupae of Camponotus floridanus, the Florida carpenter ant. Up to 21 H. floridensis wasps may develop on one C. floridanus pupa. Alachua floridensis is a junior synonym of H. floridensis.

References

Eulophidae